Meristogenys orphnocnemis is a species of frog in the family Ranidae, sometimes known as Sabah Borneo frog or dusky-footed torrent frog. It is endemic to Borneo and found in the mountains of Sabah (Malaysia), Brunei, and East Kalimantan (Indonesia).
Its natural habitats are hilly lowland rainforest, also occurring in slightly disturbed forests. Tadpoles live in clear, rocky forest streams where they cling to rocks in strong currents. Siltation of streams caused by deforestation is a threat to this species.

References

orphnocnemis
Endemic fauna of Borneo
Amphibians of Brunei
Amphibians of Indonesia
Amphibians of Malaysia
Amphibians described in 1986
Taxonomy articles created by Polbot
Amphibians of Borneo